Myzzhelovo is a rural locality (a village) in Kiprevskoye Rural Settlement, Kirzhachsky District, Vladimir Oblast, Russia. The population was 13 as of 2010. There is 1 street.

Geography 
Myzzhelovo is located on the Sheredar River, 23 km southeast of Kirzhach (the district's administrative centre) by road. Mitenino is the nearest rural locality.

References 

Rural localities in Kirzhachsky District